Zsolt Hirling (born 28 May 1984 in Budapest) is a Hungarian rower.

With Tamas Varga, he won the 2005 World Championships men's lightweight double sculls.  At European level, he won the 2007 European Rowing Championships, again with Tamas Varga, and a bronze medal in the same event with the same partner in 2008.  At Olympics level, he has appeared at three Olympics, 2004, 2008 and 2012, all in the men's lightweight double sculls and all with Tamas Varga, finishing in 5th, 14th and 11th respectively.

References

External links
 
 

1984 births
Living people
Hungarian male rowers
Rowers from Budapest
Olympic rowers of Hungary
Rowers at the 2004 Summer Olympics
Rowers at the 2008 Summer Olympics
Rowers at the 2012 Summer Olympics
World Rowing Championships medalists for Hungary
European Rowing Championships medalists